AJ Tracey is the eponymous debut studio album by British rapper AJ Tracey, released independently on 8 February 2019. It follows his EP Secure the Bag! (2017). The album features guest appearances from Not3s, Jay Critch and Giggs. Tracey embarked on a world tour from March 2019 in support of the album, with the first dates taking place in the UK and Ireland. The deluxe edition was released on 24 October 2019, with four additional songs.

Five singles were released to promote the album: "Butterflies" featuring Not3s, "Doing It", "Psych Out!", "Necklace" featuring Jay Critch, and "Ladbroke Grove". AJ Tracey received critical acclaim and debuted at number three on the UK Albums Chart. It has been certified Gold by the British Phonographic Industry (BPI). "Ladbroke Grove" peaked at number three on the UK Singles Chart, was nominated for Song of the Year at the 2020 Brit Awards and is now certified Platinum x2 by the British Phonographic Industry (BPI).

Background
Tracey told Julie Adenuga on Beats 1 that the album would feature a variety of genres, including Trinidadian soca, dance and country, explaining that in the way that "Butterflies" is "obviously not a traditional dancehall track [but] my take on dancehall, [...] when I say I'm making country music, it's my take on country music", clarifying that along with guitars and strings, the tracks feature 808s. Tracey also revealed that Smoke Boys and possibly Dave would make appearances on the album.

Title and cover art
He also said that he decided to make his debut album self-titled because he believes it to be "cool" when artists do it: "It's confident it just means like this is me, this is my project, here you go".

Tracey stated that he wanted a baby goat, and contacted the man who supplied the alligator for the video of second single "Doing It". The man told him he needed to buy two as they get lonely if they are alone; he purchased them, naming one AJ and the other Tracey, with Tracey featuring on the cover art. He later donated the goats to a farm.

Critical reception
At Metacritic, which assigns a weighted mean rating out of 100 to reviews from mainstream publications, the album received a score of 81, based on 9 reviews, indicating "universal acclaim".

Dean Van Nguyen of Pitchfork wrote that "Tracey ensures the album links the UK urban music’s past and present. Which of the mixed bag of styles deployed on AJ Tracey will be further investigated in the future remains a mystery. What is clear is that he has talent and star power for days—talents that could have been better showcased here."

However, Tom Connick writing for NME gave high acclaim for the album saying "Twisted, vibrant and ever-shifting, AJ Tracey's stellar debut is a perfect document of British rap’s current eclecticism, a record that warps sonic expectations"

Commercial performance
AJ Tracey debuted at number three on the UK Albums Chart and number one on the UK R&B Album Chart selling 12,894 copies first-week. The album debuted at number fifteen on the Irish Albums Chart, and also entered the Scottish Albums Chart and Dutch Album Top 100. AJ Tracey received 1 million streams on the day of its release.

Track listing

Samples
 "Ladbroke Grove" contains a sample of "Wandering Romance", written by Jorja Smith, Michael Stafford and Felix Joseph, and performed by Jorja Smith.

Notes
 The deluxe edition of the album features a remix of "Butterflies" featuring Popcaan in place of the original.

Charts

Weekly charts

Year-end charts

Certifications

References

2019 debut albums
AJ Tracey albums
Albums produced by AJ Tracey
Albums produced by Steel Banglez
Albums produced by Take a Daytrip